Gryllica is a genus of longhorn beetles of the subfamily Lamiinae.

 Gryllica curitibana Lane, 1965
 Gryllica flavopustulata Thomson, 1860
 Gryllica picta (Pascoe, 1858)
 Gryllica prava Lane, 1973
 Gryllica pseudopicta Lane, 1965
 Gryllica pygmaea Lane, 1973

References

Calliini
Cerambycidae genera